The Concrete Elephant is a sculpture and local landmark standing along the A30 in Camberley on approach to The Meadows roundabout. It was created by Barbara Jones for Trollope & Colls for the 1963 Lord Mayor's Show. The piece was installed in its current location in 1964, when Trollope & Colls gained permission to sit the elephant at the entrance to their yard off the A30 London Road. Over the years the sculpture has faced a number of damages, in 1982 part of the trunk fell off and in November 1987, it was painted over with large black spots.

References

Concrete sculptures in England